Edwina Findley, also known as Edwina Findley Dickerson, is an American actress.

In 2014, Findley began starring as one of lead characters in the Oprah Winfrey Network drama series, If Loving You Is Wrong. Findley is also known for her recurring roles in the HBO television dramas The Wire and Treme, and for her performance in the 2012 independent film Middle of Nowhere. In 2016, she received an Independent Spirit Award for Best Supporting Female nomination for her performance in Free in Deed.

Life and career 
Findley was born in Washington, D.C. and attended Duke Ellington School of the Arts as a musical theater major. She graduated from New York University's Tisch School of the Arts in New York.

She began her acting career in theatre. In 2003, she made her television debut in the recurring role of HBO drama series The Wire. She later guest-starred on Law & Order, Law & Order: Trial by Jury, Conviction, New Amsterdam, and had a recurring role in the ABC daytime soap opera, One Life to Live in 2005. In 2011, she also appeared in the recurring role of ABC series, Brothers & Sisters. In 2012, Findley married Kelvin Dickerson. She is a former roommate of actress Viola Davis.

Findley had a recurring role of Davina Lambreaux in the HBO drama series, Treme, from 2010 to 2013. She co-starred opposite Emayatzy Corinealdi and Lorraine Toussaint in the 2012 independent film Middle of Nowhere written and directed by Ava DuVernay. She also appeared in Sympathetic Details (2008), Red Tails (2012) and Insidious: Chapter 2 (2013).

In 2015, Findley played the lead in the independent film Free in Deed, and Kevin Hart's character wife in Get Hard, a comedy film directed by Etan Cohen. In 2014, she was cast as one of leads in the Oprah Winfrey Network prime time soap opera, If Loving You Is Wrong alongside Zulay Henao, Heather Hemmens, April Parker Jones, and Amanda Clayton. In 2016, she was cast in the Fox event series Shots Fired starring Sanaa Lathan and created by Gina Prince-Bythewood. In 2017, she was cast in AMC's Fear the Walking Dead and The CW's Black Lightning.

Filmography

Film

Television

References

External links 

American film actresses
American television actresses
American soap opera actresses
Living people
Actresses from Washington, D.C.
Tisch School of the Arts alumni
21st-century American actresses
African-American actresses
Year of birth missing (living people)